Aenigmatoceras is a genus of ammonite cephalopods from the Carboniferous of Russia.  It is tentatively placed within the family Cravenoceratidae based on similarities with Tympanoceras.

References

 The Paleobiology Database accessed on 10/01/07

Cravenoceratidae
Goniatitida genera
Fossils of Russia
Carboniferous ammonites